Togwotee Pass (pronounced TOH-guh-tee) is a high mountain pass in the western United States, at an elevation of  above sea level. On the Continental Divide in the Absaroka Mountains of northwestern Wyoming in Teton County, it is between Dubois and Moran Junction in the Jackson Hole valley.

The pass provides the most direct access to Grand Teton National Park from eastern Wyoming. Located between Two Ocean Mountain and Breccia Peak, sweeping vistas of the Teton Range are visible from the western slopes of the pass. A ski run (mainly a traverse) at the Jackson Hole ski resort is also named Togwotee Pass. 

Located in the Bridger-Teton National Forest and adjacent to Shoshone National Forest, the pass receives heavy winter snowfall and is a top destination for snowmobiling, Backcountry skiing and cross-country skiing. The Continental Divide Snowmobile Trail passes through the immediate area.

History 
The pass is named for Togwotee, a subchief under Chief Washakie of the Sheepeater tribe, a branch of the Shoshones. Togwotee led The Jones Expedition over this pass in 1873.
Before the expedition, the pass was reported to be an important trade route for native tribes.

Climate

According to the Köppen Climate Classification system, Togwotee Pass has a dry-summer subarctic climate, abbreviated "Dsc" on climate maps.

References

Shoshone National Forest
Mountain passes of Wyoming
Great Divide of North America
Mountain passes of Teton County, Wyoming